Aldeia de Santa Margarida is a parish (freguesia) in the municipality of Idanha-a-Nova in Portugal. The population in 2011 was 292, in an area of 13.62 km2.

References

External links
Diagnóstico Social do Município de Idanha-a-Nova 

Freguesias of Idanha-a-Nova